School Life also known as In Loco Parentis is a 2016 Irish-Spanish documentary film written and directed by Neasa Ní Chianáin and David Rane. The film stars Amanda Leyden and John Leyden in the lead roles. The film was premiered in several international film festivals in 2016 and 2017 while had its theatrical release in the United States on 8 September 2017. The documentary film was released in Ireland and Spain with the title In Loco Parentis but the title was later changed to School Life due to its theatrical release in the US. The film was well received and opened to positive reviews from the critics. The documentary was critically acclaimed for its storyline and screenplay and was also lauded by critics as one of the finest ever documentary films. It also received several awards and nominations in several film festivals.

Synopsis 
The story follows a year on the lives of two motivational inspirational teachers at Headfort School which is the only primary-care boarding school in Ireland. John teaches rock music, mathematics, Latin and scripture while his wife Amanda uses her eye catching experience through books to connect with the children. Both nearly half a century have helped to shape up the futures of thousands of minds and suddenly after 46 years of dedicated teaching retirement was calling on the verge for both of them.

Cast 

 Dermoit Dix as himself
 Amanda Leyden as herself
 John Leyden as himself

Critical reception 
Joyce Slaton of Common Sense Media rated 4 out of 5 stars stating "sweet, gentle and authentic, this film chronicling a year at an Irish boarding school is the very best kind of observational documentary: one that ends with viewers feeling they've met new friends."

Michael O'Sullivan of Washington Post rated 3 out of 4 stating "The film's true subjects are the aging, loveabley, quirky Leydens: John with his unkempt cloud of long, thinning hair, Amanda with her pierced eyebrow."

Ben Kenigsberg of New York Times stated "The documentary captures the routines of an Irish boarding school and it's two of the greatest cherished teachers."

Awards and nominations

References

External links 
 
 
 

2016 films
2016 documentary films
2010s Spanish-language films
Irish documentary films
Spanish biographical films
Films about education
2010s English-language films